Out of the Depths is a 1945 American war drama film directed by D. Ross Lederman.

Plot 
At the end of World War II, a U.S. Navy submarine receives an order to bring aboard Ito Kaita, a Korean American intelligence agent who joined with the resistance movement in Japanese-occupied Korea. The crew enthusiastically receives news of the surrender of Japan but gets into a skirmish with an Imperial Japanese Navy battleship refusing to surrender. After being rescued, Kaita informs the crew that a rogue Japanese aircraft carrier will attack the surrender ceremony aboard the USS Missouri in Tokyo Bay. A kamikaze attack from the rogue carrier destroys the submarine's antenna before they can warn their superiors. Captain Faversham is killed trying to fix it, and the submarine begins to sink and fill with chlorine after being hit. The crew decide to stop the carrier by ramming their submarine into it, and both ships explode. The four surviving men receive the Congressional Medal of Honor at the White House.

Cast
Jim Bannon as Capt. Faversham
Ross Hunter as Clayton Shepherd
Ken Curtis as Buck Clayton
Loren Tindall as Pete Lubowsky
Mark Roberts as 'Pills' Wilkins (as Robert E. Scott)
Frank Sully as 'Speed' Brogan
Robert Williams as First Officer Ross
Coulter Irwin as 'Sparks' Reynolds
George Khan as Lt. Ito Kaida
George Offerman Jr. as 'Ten-to-One' Ryan

References

External links
 

1945 films
1940s war drama films
American war drama films
1940s English-language films
American black-and-white films
Films directed by D. Ross Lederman
Columbia Pictures films
Submarine films
1945 drama films
Films with screenplays by Aubrey Wisberg
Films about the Korean independence movement
Films set in Korea under Japanese rule
Films set in the Pacific Ocean
Pacific War films
Films about the United States Navy in World War II
Films set in 1945
Films about submarine warfare
Films set in the White House
1940s American films